Jack Turner may refer to:

Jack Turner (footballer, born 1992), English professional footballer
Jack Turner (racing driver) (1920–2004), American racecar driver with the moniker "Cactus Jack"
Jack Turner (Australian footballer) (1926–2016), played for Richmond in the 1940s
Jack Turner (photographer) (1889–1989), war photographer from Prince Edward Island, Canada
Jack Turner (writer) (born 1968), Australian non-fiction writer and television documentary host
Jack Turner (author) (born before 1975), American author of several books concerning nature and wildlife
Jack Turner (basketball, born 1930) (1930–2014), American NBA basketball player
Jack Turner (basketball, born 1939) (1939–2013), American NBA basketball player
Jack Turner (field hockey) (born 1997), English field hockey player
Jack Turner, minor character in SNK Playmore's Art of Fighting series
Jack Turner, a character in The Nickel Boys
 Jack Turner, a nickname used by Andrew Jackson Turner (1832–1905), a Wisconsin politician.

See also
John Turner (disambiguation)
Jackie Turner, English boxer
Jackie Turner (Home and Away), Home and Away minor character